Fritz Zbinden (28 July 1922 – 15 June 1983) was a Swiss racing cyclist. He finished in last place in the 1950 Tour de France.

References

External links
 

1922 births
1983 deaths
Swiss male cyclists
Sportspeople from the canton of Vaud
Tour de Suisse stage winners